Manuchehrabad may refer to:
 Manuchehrabad, Shahreza, Isfahan Province
 Manuchehrabad, Kermanshah